Aleksandr Tarasov (23 March 1927 – 16 June 1984) was a Soviet modern pentathlete and Olympic Champion. He competed at the 1956 Summer Olympics in Melbourne, where he won a gold medal in the team competition (together with Ivan Deryugin and Igor Novikov, and placed eighth in the individual competition.

References

External links

1927 births
1984 deaths
Russian male modern pentathletes
Soviet male modern pentathletes
Olympic modern pentathletes of the Soviet Union
Modern pentathletes at the 1956 Summer Olympics
Olympic gold medalists for the Soviet Union
Olympic medalists in modern pentathlon
Sportspeople from Moscow
Medalists at the 1956 Summer Olympics